Gladstorm Kwabena Akwaboah Jnr., known by his stage name Akwaboah Jnr, is a Ghanaian singer-songwriter and producer from Mampong Beposo. He wrote "Daa Ke Daa" for Becca and "Ayeyi Ndwom" for DSP Kofi Sarpong. Both songs won their respective artistes' awards at the 2010 Ghana Music Awards, with Akwaboah subsequently being adjudged the "Song Writer for the Year" for "Daa Ke Daa".

Akwaboah, who is a master keyboardist, has played for a lot of local and international artistes including Hugh Masekela and John Legend, and has assisted several musicians to make it big in the industry. The talented singer-songwriter and producer Akwaboah was signed unto Sarkcess music, a record label owned by BET Award winner Sarkodie. Akwaboah also produced and co-wrote BET Award winner Sarkodie's fourth album "Mary".

Career 
Having hailed from a family of musicians, Akwaboah Jnr. started his music career in his early teenage years. however, he first made headlines in 2009 when the songs that he had written, Ayeyi Ndwom for DSP Kofi Sarpong and Daa Ke Daa for Becca, won their respective artiste awards at the 2010 Ghana Music Awards. In the same year, Akwaboah Jnr. won the songwriter of the year award for the Daa Ke Daa song. Aside being a songwriter, Akwaboah also serves as a judge on a popular Kid's program dubbed "Nsromma". Being a master keyboardist, Akwaboah Jnr. has had the honor of playing for both local and international artistes such as John Legend.

Discography

Studio album 

 Matters of the Heart (2018)

Annual concert 
Akwaboah hosts the shades of love concert every year on February 14.

 Shades of Love 2019
 Shades of Love 2020

Awards and nominations

Ghana Music Awards

|-
|rowspan="2"|2016
|rowspan="1"|Himself
|Best Male Vocal Performance
|
|-
|rowspan="1"|"Mewu" (Sarkodie featuring Akwaboah)
| Best Collaboration of the Year
|
|-
|rowspan="1"|2014
|rowspan="3"|Himself
|New Artist of the Year
|
|-
|rowspan="1"|2013
|Songwriter of the Year
|
|-
|rowspan="1"|2010
|Songwriter of the Year
|
|-
|}
Highlife Song of the Year –  2019 Highlife Music Awards

Nominated for the Male Vocalist of the Year at the 2021 Vodafone Ghana Music Awards with his song 'Posti Me'

References

Living people
21st-century Ghanaian male singers
21st-century Ghanaian singers
Ghanaian songwriters
Year of birth missing (living people)